List of active Royal Marines military watercraft is a list of landing craft and other watercraft in service with the Royal Marines. It consist of a varied fleet of transport vessels, patrol vessels and special forces watercraft (I.e mini submarines etc.) maintained by the Royal Navy and designed to transport the Royal Marines or special forces from ship to shore as well as conduct river or estuary patrols.

Landing Craft

As of 2014, there are presently 33 Landing Craft in service with the Royal Marines; 10 LCUs, 19 LCVPs and 4 LCACs. Total displacement is approximately 3,000 tonnes.

Offshore Raiding Craft

The Offshore Raiding Craft (ORC) is a recent addition to the Royal Marines inventory. The ORC is primarily employed for 'Strategic Raiding' where speed and covertness is desired, however, the Offshore Raiding Craft is equally as capable when conducting amphibious operations alongside the larger and more traditional LCACs, LCUs and LCVPs. The ORC is fitted with several general purpose machine guns as well as protection against enemy fire for the troops inside. The ORC can be underslung from a helicopter or deployed from ships of various sizes. 39 ORC are currently in service with the Royal Marines

Raiding Craft

The Raiding Craft (RC) are operated in large numbers by the Royal Marines and can be divided into two groups; The Rigid Raider (RRC), and the smaller Inflatable Raiding Craft (IRC). Despite being the smallest of the amphibious craft, the Raiding Craft are the most widely used due to their mobility and versatility. As such, the RCs often find themselves deployed in amphibious and riverine operations around the globe, in environments ranging from the Arctic to the tropics. Examples of these craft are not only embarked on all amphibious warfare vessels, but are also carried aboard other Royal Navy ships for use on patrol duties, such as searching ships or anti-piracy.

Specialist Craft

The Royal Navy operate three SDV Mk8 Mod 1 mini-submarines for use by the Special Boat Service. They are designed to deliver special forces personnel and their equipment for covert special operations missions on hostile shores. The British SDV Mk8 Mod 1 is the same as used by the United States Navy SEALs.  In 2018 it was announced that the UK would buy three MK 11 Shallow Water Combat Submersibles (SWCS) to replace the Mk8s.

From 2011 to 2013, the Royal Marines leased four CB90-class fast assault craft from the Swedish Armed Forces to gain operational insight into the design and capabilities of such a craft. The CB90 or a similar vessel may in future fulfil the Royal Marines concept of the 'Future Force Protection Craft'. It is intended that such a vessel would provide a Task Group in the littoral zones protection from hostile fast attack craft.

The Fast Insertion Craft (FIC) is in use with the Special Boat Service. It has a reported maximum speed of up to 55 knots and its hull features a highly stealthy design and advanced 'wave piercing' qualities. It is similar to the American Mark V Special Operations Craft.

Patrol Boats

The Royal Marines operate three dedicated patrol vessels of the Island-class based at HMNB Clyde. They are tasked with protecting high value Royal Navy ships such as the Vanguard-class submarines. The vessels -called Mull, Rona and Eorsa- are ex MoD Police boats. Mull and Rona were handed over to the Royal Marines during 2013, with Eorsa arriving at a later date.

See also

Lists of ships operated by or in support of Her Majesty's Naval Service
 List of active Royal Navy ships
 List of active Royal Fleet Auxiliary ships
 List of ships of Serco Marine Services

References

External links
Royal Marines - Landing Craft (royalnavy.mod.uk)

Watercraft
United Kingdom